Koretno is a settlement in the Municipality of Šmarje pri Jelšah in eastern Slovenia. It lies in the hills southeast of Šmarje, off the local road towards Pristava pri Mestinju. The area is part of the traditional region of Styria. The municipality is included in the Savinja Statistical Region.

References

External links
Koretno at Geopedia

Populated places in the Municipality of Šmarje pri Jelšah